Michael Nsien (born February 14, 1981) is a Nigerian-American former professional soccer player and coach.

Player

Career
Nsien played college soccer at the University of Dayton between 1999 and 2003, scoring 9 goals at left fullback in 73 appearances.

Following college, Nsien signed with the LA Galaxy in 2005 as a reserve player, and then with the USL’s Portland Timbers in 2006. He also played in the UAE for UAE Pro-League side Al-Shaab and was a member of the 2003 Nigerian U-23 National Team that ultimately failed to qualify for the 2004 Olympics in Athens.

Coaching
Nsien became an assistant coach for the Tulsa Roughnecks, before taking over the side from David Vaudreuil as interim head coach in June 2018. Nsien was named the permanent head coach in December 2018. Nsien was relieved of coaching duties in June 2022.

Nsien was named head coach of the United States U-16 men's national team on November 15, 2022.

References

1981 births
Living people
Sportspeople from Tulsa, Oklahoma
American soccer players
American expatriate soccer players
Nigerian footballers
Dayton Flyers men's soccer players
LA Galaxy players
Portland Timbers (2001–2010) players
FC Tulsa coaches
Association football defenders
Soccer players from Oklahoma
American soccer coaches
American expatriate sportspeople in the United Arab Emirates
Expatriate footballers in the United Arab Emirates
Nigeria youth international footballers